
The phrase "bell, book, and candle" refers to a Latin Christian method of excommunication by anathema, imposed on a person who had committed an exceptionally grievous sin. Evidently introduced by Pope Zachary around the middle of the 8th century, the rite was once used by the Roman Catholic Church.

Ritual 

The ceremony was described in the Pontificale Romanum until the time of the Second Vatican Council. Subsequent post-conciliar editions of the Pontificale omitted mention of any particular solemnities associated with excommunication.

The ceremony traditionally involved a bishop, with 12 priests bearing candles, and would solemnly be pronounced in some suitably conspicuous place. The bishop would then pronounce the formula of the anathema, which ends with the following words:

In English:

After this recitation the priests would respond: Fiat, fiat, fiat ("So be it! So be it! So be it!") The bishop would then ring a bell, close a holy book, and he and the assisting priests would snuff out their candles by dashing them to the ground. However, the rite of anathema as described in the Pontificale Romanum only prescribes that the candles be dashed to the ground. After the ritual, written notices would be sent to the neighbouring bishops and priests to report that the target had been anathematized and why, so that they and their constituents would hold no communication with the target.

This form of excommunication was inflicted on Robert II of France by Pope Gregory V for his marriage to Bertha of Burgundy in the year 996, because Bertha was his cousin. He was later reconciled with the Church after negotiations with Gregory's successor Pope Silvester II.

References

Further reading
 

 phrases.com

Catholic liturgy
Excommunication